The Bell Sidewinder is an American ultralight aircraft, supplied as a kit for amateur construction.

Design and development
The Sidewinder is a copy of the Phantom X1 that was built by former Phantom Aeronautics employee Fred Bell. It features a cable-braced high-wing, a single-seat, open cockpit, tricycle landing gear and a single engine in tractor configuration.

The aircraft is made from bolted-together aluminum tubing, with the flying surfaces covered in Dacron sailcloth. The Sidewinder differs from the X1 in having flaps. Its  span wing is cable-braced from an inverted "V" kingpost mounted on top of the wing. The landing gear has suspension on all wheels and features a steerable nosewheel, plus main wheel brakes. The pilot is accommodated on an open seat, partially enclosed by a fibreglass fairing with a windshield.

Specifications (Sidewinder)

See also

References

1980s United States ultralight aircraft
Homebuilt aircraft
Parasol-wing aircraft
Single-engined tractor aircraft